Night by Night is a UK-based melodic rock band founded in 2008 by Ben Christo (guitarist of The Sisters Of Mercy) and Jonny Thornton. The band's music style is that of a modern take on the classic 80's bands such as Def Leppard with its dual guitars and three-part vocal harmonies.

Early years (2008–2011) 

The original line up with Ben Christo as lead singer/guitarist, bassist Jonny Thornton, guitarist Iain Frisk and Moyano de Diego on drums toured Europe from late 2008, notably supporting Alannah Myles. Jonny Thornton appeared in the July 2010 issue of Bass Guitar magazine discussing his on stage equipment with Night by Night.

Following the introduction of a new guitarist (Tom Daniel) and drummer (Damien Diablo) in 2010, the band expanded to a five piece with temporary vocalist Willy Norton (Neonfly) leading to a search for a permanent lead singer. This culminated in Daniel Rossall being selected for lead vocals in 2011.

In June 2011, Ben Christo was interviewed about the band's forthcoming EP for Fireworks Melodic Rock Magazine which appeared in issue 47 along with the band's track 'Can't Walk Away' included in the magazine's cover CD.

2012–present 

Night by Night recorded its debut album with producer Romesh Dodangoda in late 2012. Prior to leaving the band, Daniel Rossall was interviewed about Night by Night in the December 2012 issue of  Classic Rock Presents AOR.

The band carried out a UK tour supporting Jettblack in 2012.  and a performance at the sixth Hard Rock Hell festival held in October 2012 at Gwynedd, North Wales. Henry Rundell, former singer for Voodoo Six, joined Night By Night in late 2012.

In March 2013, Night By Night was awarded single/EP of the year with "Time To Escape" at the 2013 Pure Rawk Awards.

Jonny Thornton appeared in the October 2012 issue of Bass Guitar magazine revealing the musical influences on the band.

In June 2013, the band members received a sponsorship from fashion house Bolongaro Trevor for stage clothing in time for the shooting of The Moment video.

In September 2013, the band supported Y&T on a UK Tour.

In early 2014, Night by Night signed to Sun Hill Production, a Swedish-based label.

In March 2014, Europe played four dates in their homeland of Sweden and were supported solely by Night by Night.

In March 2015 the band announced that they had amicably parted ways with Henry Rundell, and would be seeking a new singer. Daniel Leigh of New Device filled in to help fulfill existing performance commitments.

Band members

Current members 

 Ben Christo - Lead guitars, backing vocals : 2008 to present
 Jonny Thornton - Bass guitar, backing vocals : 2008 to present
 Tom Daniel - Lead guitars : 2010 to present
 Damian Diablo - Drums : 2010 to present

Former members

 Daniel Rossall - Lead vocals : 2011 to 2012
 Henry Rundell - Lead vocals : 2012 to 2015
 Iain Frisk - rhythm guitars, backing vocals : 2008 to 2010
 Moyano de Diego - Drums : 2008 to 2010

Discography

Albums 
 N×N : 2014
 01. Time To Escape
 02. Holding Onto Holding On
 03. Can't Walk Away
 04. Everywhere Tonight
 05. Siren
 06. A Thousand Lies
 07. It's Not Faith
 08. The Moment
 09. If Only
 10. Never Die Again

Singles / EPs 
 Just Tonight : 2008
 Can't Walk Away / The Moment / It's Not Faith : 2010
 Time To Escape / The Moment : 2012
 Tune Out The Static (Time To Escape / If Only / The Moment) : 2013
 A Thousand Lies 2014

References

External links 
 Official Website

British rock music groups